Ammama or 'Emma (Arabic: عمامة; Egyptian Arabic: عمة IPA: [ˈʕem.mæ] or AMMĀMA, Arabic ʿEMĀMA) is a type of turban that is religiously significant to Muslims. Men in Egypt or Sudan usually wear an 'emma with the jellabiya dress. Wearing this headgear symbolizes authority, strength and honor.

See also 

Jellabiya

References 

Arabic clothing
Headgear
Religious headgear

Middle Eastern clothing
Dresses
Islamic male clothing